Fred Weightman (1863 – 1897) was an English footballer who played in The Football League for Notts County.

References

1863 births
1897 deaths
English footballers
Notts County F.C. players
English Football League players
Nottingham Forest F.C. players
Association football forwards